Dasyophthalma is a genus of medium-sized brownish butterflies in the family Nymphalidae. They are endemic to the Atlantic coastal region of Brazil. They feed on palms.

Species
Dasyophthalma creusa (Hübner, [1821])
Dasyophthalma geraensis Rebel, 1922
Dasyophthalma rusina (Godart, [1824])
Dasyophthalma vertebralis Butler, 1869

References

 , 2009: Phylogeny of Dasyophthalma butterflies (Lepidoptera: Nymphalidae: Brassolini). Insecta Mundi 0069: 1-12. Full article:

External links
tolweb

Morphinae
Nymphalidae of South America
Nymphalidae genera
Taxa named by John O. Westwood